This is a list of slums in Sri Lanka.

Usavi Watta (Usaui Walta) 
Wanathamulla

See also

 List of slums

Slums
Sri Lanka